Line 1 of the Nanning Metro a rapid transit line running from west to east Nanning. It opened on the 28 June 2016. This line is currently 32.1 km long with 25 stations.

Opening timeline

Stations

References

01
Railway lines opened in 2016
2016 establishments in China